Minerva Township may refer to:

Minerva Township, Marshall County, Iowa
Minerva Township, Clearwater County, Minnesota